Gola Konneh District is one of five districts located in Grand Cape Mount County, Liberia. As of the 2008 Census, it has a population of 23,518.

Districts of Liberia
Grand Cape Mount County